Iran competed at the World Games 2017 in Wroclaw, Poland, from 20 July 2017 to 30 July 2017.

Competitors

Source :

Karate
Iran  has qualified at the 2017 World Games:

Men's Individual Kumite -60 kg - 1 quota (Amir Mehdizadeh) 
Men's Individual Kumite -75 kg - 1 quota (Asiabari Aliasghar)
Women's Individual Kumite +68 kg - 1 quota (Hamideh Abbasali)

Kickboxing
Iran  has qualified at the 2017 World Games:

Men's  -63.5 kg
Men's  -67 kg
Men's  -75 kg 
Men's  -86 kg 
Women's  -56 kg

References 

Nations at the 2017 World Games
2017 in Iranian sport
Iran at multi-sport events